Poienile de sub Munte (or Havasmező; ;) is a commune in Maramureș County, Maramureș, Romania. It is one of the oldest places in Maramureș, being mentioned for the first time in 1353. It is the biggest commune in the county and is composed of a single village, Poienile de sub Munte.

References

Communes in Maramureș County
Localities in Romanian Maramureș
Shtetls
Ukrainian communities in Romania